{{Infobox school
|name                   = Whittier Christian High School
|image                   = Whittier Christian Shield.jpg
| streetaddress     = 501 N Beach Blvd
|city                   = La Habra
|state                  = California
| zipcode           = 90631
|country                = United States
|coordinates = 
| type          = Private
| religion          = non-denominational Christian
|established            = 1958
| grades            = 9-12
| conference        = CIF Southern Section
Olympic League
| mascot            = Herald
| accreditation     = Western Association of Schools and Colleges, Association of Christian Schools International
| newspaper         = The Herald
| yearbook          = The Trumpet| fees              = $400
|head of school              = Carl Martinez
| team name            = Heralds
|enrollment             = 500
| colors =  Red Gold White
| tuition           = $12,950 (2016-2017)
|homepage               = http://www.wchs.com
}}Whittier Christian High School''' is a non-profit, non-denominational, Christian high school located in La Habra, California. It was founded in 1958. The high school has a gymnasium named the Leon Davis Event Center, after the school worker Leon Davis. Whittier Christian is also nicknamed "Dub-C".

History
Whittier Christian High School opened on September 15, 1958, though planning for the school began only nine months earlier on January 4, 1958. WCHS welcomed forty-four 9th and 10th grade students to the College Avenue Church of the Nazarene facilities. By October 1975, the student body had grown to 380 high school students, and Whittier Christian moved to the Grovedale Elementary campus in East Whittier. In 1979, the school leased the Maybrook campus to serve the freshmen students. It was 1981 when the tenth-twelfth grade students moved to the current campus in La Habra.

Athletics
Since its founding in 1958 the school has won 102 League Championships.  In addition it has 18 CIF Championships:

Football: 1979, 1983, 1984, 1990, 2010 runners-up, 2022 D14 CIF champions
Baseball: 1987
Boys Basketball: 1989
Girls Basketball: 2007, 2008, 
Boys Volleyball: 1991, 1992, 1993, 2018 
Girls Volleyball: 2000, 2008 runners-up, 2009, 2012, 2013
Softball: 2005, 2009, 2010

Notable alumni
 Megan Jesolva (Class of 2007), a member of the Atlanta Beat of Women's Professional Soccer (WPS). 
Lauren Maltby (Class of 2002) of Disney's Movie Surfers and Disney Channel Original movies, Zenon. 
Sam Paulescu (Class of 2002), NFL punter
Jenna Johnson (Class of 1985), former competitive swimmer, winner of three medals at the 1984 Summer Olympics in Los Angeles, California.
Brad Lamm (Class of 1984), Interventionist, Author of How to Help the One You Love: A New Way to Intervene (2010), JUST 10 LBS (2011) and Hand to Mouth (2015), and founder of Breathe Life Healing Centers.Brad Lamm
Tim Minear (Class of 1981) Writer, Director and Producer Television and Film and Executive Producer; American Horror Story.
Roger Mobley (Class of 1967), former television and motion picture actor, starred in the series Fury'' and numerous Walt Disney films.
Rob Liefeld (Class of 1985), artist for Marvel Entertainment. Created Deadpool, Cable, X-Force, Youngblood, Brigade and more.
Camerone Chambers Parker (Class of 1983), Supermodel, Philanthropist and Author of A Model Patient (2023)

References
5. Camerone Parker

External links 
Whittier Christian High School

High schools in Orange County, California
Private high schools in California
La Habra, California
1958 establishments in California